The pygmy siltsnail, scientific name Floridobia parva, is a species of very small freshwater snail with a gill and an operculum, an aquatic gastropod mollusk in the family Hydrobiidae. This species is endemic to the United States.

References

Endemic fauna of the United States
Hydrobiidae
Floridobia
Gastropods described in 1968
Taxonomy articles created by Polbot